Grebnevo is a rural locality (a village) in Shchyolkovsky District of Moscow Oblast, Russia, located about  east of Moscow, on the outskirt of the town of Fryazino, on the bank of the Lyuboseyevka River.

History
Best known for its historical manor, Grebnevo served as a country seat of the Galitzine, Trubetskoy, and Bibikov noble families. Among the early owners were Bogdan Belsky and Dmitry Troubetskoy. The last Russian boyar, Ivan Trubetskoy, gave the property to his daughter Anastasia, the wife of Prince Dimitrie Cantemir, whose daughter Catherine further expanded the estate. Mikhail Kheraskov, the foremost poet of Catherine the Great's time, was the next owner. It was in Grebnevo that he completed the Rossiad, arguably the longest Russian poem.

In the late 19th-century, the estate was owned by a merchant family which built several small factories on the grounds. Fyodor Grinevsky, one of Moscow's most popular physicians, bought Grebnevo in 1913. He operated the property as a sanatorium.

Architecture
The surviving Neoclassical buildings were constructed between the 1780s and the 1830s by Major General Gavrila Bibikov and Prince Sergey D. Galitzine. These include the palatial house of three stories with the six-columned portico (1790s), the Doric entrance gate resembling a Roman triumphal arch (1821), and two Neoclassical churches. An elaborate network of ponds also dates from that period.

The blood-red church (1791) is the earlier of the two. It is dedicated to the Theotokos of Grebnevo, an icon reportedly presented to Dmitry Donskoy after the Battle of Kulikovo. "Its four arms finish in elegant porticoes with pediments under a domed rotunda over which a shining gilded angel holds the cross".

In 1960, the Grebnevo estate was declared to be a museum. In the 1990s and 2000s, the palace survived several fires. Apart from the churches, the manor is currently in a state of disrepair.

References

Rural localities in Moscow Oblast
Palaces in Russia
Neoclassical architecture in Russia
Buildings and structures in Moscow Oblast
Cultural heritage monuments of federal significance in Moscow Oblast